Michael J. Vendetti (c.1932 – March 20, 2014) was an American football, tennis and track and field coach.  He was the head football coach at the Nichols College in Dudley, Massachusetts from 1962 to 1985.

Vendetti also served as a tennis coach and a track and field coach while at Nichols, as well as serving as a track coach at Worcester Polytechnic Institute in Worcester, Massachusetts from 1987 to 1989.

Head coaching record

Football

References

Year of birth missing
1930s births
2014 deaths
Nichols Bison football coaches
Vermont Catamounts football coaches
College tennis coaches in the United States
College track and field coaches in the United States
Boston University alumni
People from Leominster, Massachusetts
Sportspeople from Worcester County, Massachusetts